Kate Challis Excelsa Hooper  (25 June 1894 – 29 November 1982) was a New Zealand nurse, nursing administrator, community worker and feminist. She was born in Devonport, Auckland, New Zealand on 25 June 1894.

In the 1969 New Year Honours, Hooper was appointed an Officer of the Order of the British Empire, for services to the community, especially to nursing and voluntary organisations.

References

1894 births
1982 deaths
New Zealand nurses
New Zealand feminists
New Zealand social workers
People from Auckland
New Zealand Officers of the Order of the British Empire
New Zealand women nurses